Callero is a surname. Notable people with the surname include:

Joe Callero (born 1962), American basketball coach